The Hum Award for Best Original Soundtrack is one of the award presented annually by the Hum Television Network and Entertainment Channel (HTNEC) to composers and performers, working in the Television industry. Since its inception, however, the award has commonly been referred to as the hum for "Best Original Soundtrack". Unlike others, awards particularly given to Performer of the song and composers. Nominations are made by Hum members who are songwriters and composers, and the winners are chosen by the Hum membership as a whole. From 4th Hum Awards onwards, the category was inducted in the Viewers Choice Awards, where winner are selected by public votings.

History
Hum award for best OST is the award that is girven to Composers and Singers of Dramas, soap operas & sitcoms Original Television Soundtracks. As of first ceremony, OST of drama Serial Mere Qatil Mere Dildar won this award which is sung and Compose by Sohail Haider and Sara Raza Khan. The award name is officially termed as:

 2013 → 2015: Hum Award for Best Original Soundtrack.
 2016 → present: Hum Award for Best Original Soundtrack Popular.

Eligibility and rules

Acclaimed OST's from highly rated serials are eligible for nominations, nominations decided by the Hum TV, composers and Musicians while winners are announces by Hum Membership as a whole. Usually OTS is overviewed and selected by composers with the scoring on a scale 0–10, song receiving 7.5 score is eligible for nominations, OST of TV drama serial must be acclaimed and must have it qualifying run for awards.

List of winners and nominees

Winners are listed first in boldface with the awarding year and ceremony number.

2010s

See also
 Hum Awards
 Hum Awards pre-show
 List of Hum Awards Ceremonies

References

External links
Official websites
 Hum Awards official website
 Hum Television Network and Entertainment Channel (HTNEC)
 Hum's Channel at YouTube (run by the Hum Television Network and Entertainment Channel)
 Hum Awards at Facebook (run by the Hum Television Network and Entertainment Channel)]

Hum Award winners
Hum TV
Hum Network Limited